was a Japanese textile artist, weaver, and educator. She was born in Sakai, Osaka Prefecture. She is famous for establishing the modern Japanese style of weaving known as Saori, as well as a philosophical framework for weaving which included Zen philosophy.

References

1913 births
2018 deaths
People from Sakai, Osaka
Japanese centenarians
Women centenarians
Japanese weavers